Bernd Wehmeyer  (born 6 June 1952 in Herford) is a retired German footballer. He spent 11 seasons in the Bundesliga with Arminia Bielefeld, Hannover 96 and Hamburger SV.

Honours
Hamburger SV
 European Cup winner: 1982–83
 European Cup runner-up: 1979–80
 UEFA Cup finalist: 1981–82
 Bundesliga champion: 1978–79, 1981–82, 1982–83
 Bundesliga runner-up: 1979–80, 1980–81, 1983–84

References

External links
 

1952 births
Living people
German footballers
Arminia Bielefeld players
Hamburger SV players
Hannover 96 players
Bundesliga players
Olympic footballers of West Germany
West German footballers
Footballers at the 1984 Summer Olympics
Association football midfielders
People from Herford
Sportspeople from Detmold (region)
Footballers from North Rhine-Westphalia